Carroll County is a United States county located in the southwestern part of the Commonwealth of Virginia.  Roughly one fifth of the county lies in the Virginia Piedmont region, while the rest is part of the Appalachian Mountains.  The county seat and largest town is Hillsville.

The county was established in 1842 from part of Grayson County, and was officially named in honor of Charles Carroll, a signer of the Declaration of Independence.  The borders of Carroll County were later expanded by including land from Patrick County.

The total size of the county is 478 square miles (1,238 km2), and, as of the 2020 census, the population was 29,155.

History

The first European settlers arrived in the region in the mid 18th century.  These were primarily Scotch-Irish pioneers, who were used to high mountain altitudes.  However, early settlement was slow, mostly due to the poor agricultural soil of the area.  As a result, lead mining was one of the first economic activities in the region.

As the area's population density increased, Carroll County was created in 1842 from part of Grayson County. The new county was officially named for Charles Carroll, a signer of the Declaration of Independence, from Maryland. However, other accounts assert that John Carroll, a Virginia state legislator, had named the county in his own honor, but was blocked by a political rival who had it officially named for Charles Carroll instead.

Parts of Patrick County were added later to increase the size of Carroll County.  The first piece was taken in 1845, and another part, which would later become the Fancy Gap District, was added in 1854.

Geography
It is the only county in Virginia with Piedmont topography of roughly one fifth in the southeast part of the county and mountain topography of roughly four fifths elsewhere of the county. The Blue Ridge escarpment usually defines the county lines in both North Carolina and Virginia. The CDP community of Cana is in the Virginia Piedmont while the rest of the county is in the Appalachian Mountains.

Adjacent counties / Independent city
Galax, Virginia - west
Grayson County, Virginia - west
Wythe County, Virginia - northwest
Pulaski County, Virginia - north
Floyd County, Virginia - northeast
Patrick County, Virginia - southeast
Surry County, North Carolina - south

Protected areas

National
 Blue Ridge Parkway (part)
 Jefferson National Forest (part)
 Mount Rogers National Recreation Area (part)

Other
 Devil's Den Nature Preserve

Major highways
 (future)

Demographics

2020 census

Note: the US Census treats Hispanic/Latino as an ethnic category. This table excludes Latinos from the racial categories and assigns them to a separate category. Hispanics/Latinos can be of any race.

2000 Census
As of the census of 2000, there were 29,245 people, 12,186 households, and 8,786 families residing in the county.  The population density was 61 people per square mile (24/km2).  There were 14,680 housing units at an average density of 31 per square mile (12/km2).  The racial makeup of the county was 97.97% White, 0.44% Black or African American, 0.14% Native American, 0.10% Asian, 0.82% from other races, and 0.53% from two or more races.  1.64% of the population were Hispanic or Latino of any race.

There were 12,186 households, out of which 27.80% had children under the age of 18 living with them, 59.70% were married couples living together, 8.60% had a female householder with no husband present, and 27.90% were non-families. 25.40% of all households were made up of individuals, and 12.20% had someone living alone who was 65 years of age or older.  The average household size was 2.36 and the average family size was 2.80.

In the county, the population was spread out, with 21.10% under the age of 18, 7.20% from 18 to 24, 28.00% from 25 to 44, 26.70% from 45 to 64, and 17.00% who were 65 years of age or older.  The median age was 41 years. For every 100 females there were 97.20 males.  For every 100 females age 18 and over, there were 94.10 males. The median income for a household in the county was $30,597, and the median income for a family was $36,755. Males had a median income of $25,907 versus $19,697 for females. The per capita income for the county was $16,475.  About 8.70% of families and 12.50% of the population were below the poverty line, including 15.70% of those under age 18 and 14.10% of those age 65 or over.

Government and politics
Carroll County, like neighboring Floyd, is a historical anomaly in being a solidly Republican county in “Solid South” Virginia, due to desertions from the Confederate army during the Civil War. It was the only county in Virginia to vote for William Howard Taft during the 1912 election, and the only Democrat to carry the county in a presidential election since 1896 has been Franklin D. Roosevelt in 1932. Since 1980 no Democrat has gained forty percent of the county's vote, and even with Virginian Tim Kaine on the ticket, Hillary Clinton gained less than twenty percent in the 2016 election. Democratic Senatorial candidate Mark Warner did however carry Carroll County in his landslide 2008 victory.

Board of Supervisors
Fancy Gap District: Phillip R. McCraw (R)
Laurel Fork District: Joe Neil Webb
Pine Creek District: Tracy D. Moore
Pipers Gap District: Thomas W. Littrell (R)
Sulphur Springs District: Rex Hill (R)
At Large: Robbie McCraw (R)

Constitutional officers
Clerk of the Circuit Court: Gerald Ray Goad (D) (2016- )
Commissioner of the Revenue: Fran McPherson (R)
Commonwealth's Attorney: Roger D. Brooks (R) (2020- )
Sheriff: Kevin A. Kemp (R) (2020- )
Treasurer: Bonita M. Williams (R)

Carroll County is represented by 
William M. “Bill” Stanley (Republican) and David R. Suetterlein (Republican) in the Virginia Senate,
Jeffrey L. Campbell (Republican) in the Virginia House of Delegates, 
Tim Kaine (Democrat) and Mark Warner (Democrat) in the U.S. Senate, and Morgan Griffith (Republican) in the U.S. House of Representatives.

Education

Public high schools
Carroll County High School, in Hillsville, serves the county. Home of the Cavaliers, CCHS is a 9-12 comprehensive high school. The school was created by the consolidation of Woodlawn High School (Woodlawn, Virginia) and Hillsville High School (Hillsville, Virginia).
CCHS Official Site

Communities

Town
Hillsville

Census-designated places
Cana
Fancy Gap
Hilltown (also in Grayson County)
Woodlawn

Other unincorporated communities
Austinville
Dugspur
Lambsburg
Laurel Fork
Sylvatus

Notable people
 Floyd Allen  (1856-1913) – former landowner and chief patriarch of the powerful Allen clan; convicted and executed for murder after sensational 1912 Hillsville courthouse shootout that killed five people including Circuit Judge Thornton Massie, Commonwealth's Attorney William Foster, and sheriff Lewis Webb.
 Doc Ayers – former Major League Baseball pitcher, Washington Senators, Detroit Tigers
 Kylene Barker – Miss America 1979
 Frank Beamer – former head football coach at Virginia Tech - List of college football coaches with 200 wins
 George Lafayette Carter – former land and railroad entrepreneur instrumental in the establishment of East Tennessee State University
 Charles B. Morris (1931-1996) – former U.S. Army, awarded the Medal of Honor, 1967
 Ernest Stoneman  (1893–1968) – former country musician

See also
National Register of Historic Places listings in Carroll County, Virginia

References

External links

Grayson Carroll Galax VA Directory
County government website

 
Virginia counties
1842 establishments in Virginia
Populated places established in 1842
Counties of Appalachia